Maja e Popljuces is a mountain in Albania in the Accursed Mountains range. It is located just south of Maja Jezercë.

Mountains of Albania
Accursed Mountains